Fumio Takashima (髙島 郁夫 Takashima Fumio born May 20, 1956) is a Japanese entrepreneur. He is the founder and CEO of Francfranc Corporation (previously named Bals Corporation).

He likes contemporary art and often collaborates with magazines.

Work aside, he is a triathlete and enjoys surfing.

Early years 

Fumio was born in Fukui Prefecture, Japan in 1956. He went to college and graduated from Kansai University.His mother was housewife and his father was working in the banking industry.His mother's parents were running a business and he remembers helping them when he was a kid. He spent his youth observing how businesses were run.

Career 
Fumio started his career as a furniture sales manager in Maruichi selling company (マルイチセーリング). He particularly devoted his time to understanding people needs.

In 1990, he established BALS Corporation in Tokyo (to be renamed Francfranc Corporation in 2017).

In 1992, Francfranc brand name was born and the first shop opened in Higashi-Shinagawa, Tokyo. Fumio's vision was to bring colour, sense and fun into people lives.

In 2003, the first store outside Japan was opened (Hong Kong, Causeway bay).

In 2017, Francfranc hit a milestone and became a 25 years old brand.

In 2018, Fumio imaginated a new brand called Masterrecipe. The concept? To use traditional craft technique to create modern design for furniture and decorative objects.

Up to this day, Fumio Takashima remains the CEO of Francfranc Corporation.

Financial times in 2006 said " Fumio Takashima may soon be Japan’s equivalent of the UK’s Sir Terence Conran ".

Other works and achievements 

Published books

2008: Thinking while managing Francfranc (original title: フランフランを経営しながら考えたこと―Francfrancからデザインビジネスの可能性を拡げるバルスの戦略).

2009: The unbreakable management (original title: ぶれない経営―ブランドを育てた8人のトップが語る - Collaborative work).

2010: No result without passion (original title: 遊ばない社員はいらない).

Since 2010: Collaboration with Goethe lifestyle magazine

Sport

2013 : Ironman Triathlon Melbourne finisher.

Ironman 70.3 Triathlon: Auckland, San Diego, Nagoya, Singapore, Taiwan.

Ironman 51.5 Triathlon: participated in a lot of races

Collaborations 
2006: Fumio Takashima and Hervé Gambs (French designer) collaborated on artificial flowers collection and custom furniture for Bals Tokyo and Francfranc stores.

2014: Fumio and Tyler Brûlé collaboration between Francfranc and Monocle brand.

2015: Fumio and Nika Zupanc (Italian designer) collaborated for design furniture.

References 

 Japantime.co.jp. June 2009.
 Bloomberg. Profile of Bals Corporation CEO - Fumio Takashima
 Japantime.co.jp. Article about Tyler Brûlé and his products present in Francfranc Stores.
 hervegambs.fr. " 2006 “Exclusive” collection for Francfranc Japan".
 nikazupanc.com/francfranc. Collaboration for Francfranc.
 Financial times (www.ft.com). "Fumio Takashima may soon be Japan’s equivalent of the UK’s Sir Terence Conran" 

Specific

1956 births
Japanese businesspeople
Living people
Kansai University alumni